Amberley, locally known as Amberley Village, is a village in Hamilton County, Ohio, United States. The population was 3,840 at the 2020 census.

History
Amberley was incorporated as a village on April 5, 1940. The town was named after Amberley, a village in England.

Amberley was designated a Tree City USA by the National Arbor Day Foundation in 2004. Amberley is home to French Park, owned by the city of Cincinnati.

Geography
Amberley is located at  (39.199259, -84.420601).

Demographics

The village has a large Jewish population.

2010 census
As of the census of 2010, there were 3,585 people, 1,385 households, and 1,084 families living in the village. The racial makeup of the village was 85.7% White, 9.5% African American, 0.1% Native American, 3.0% Asian, 0.3% from other races, and 1.4% from two or more races. Hispanic or Latino of any race were 1.3% of the population.

There were 1,385 households, of which 29.2% had children under the age of 18 living with them, 71.7% were married couples living together, 4.7% had a female householder with no husband present, 1.9% had a male householder with no wife present, and 21.7% were non-families. 18.1% of all households were made up of individuals, and 9.4% had someone living alone who was 65 years of age or older. The average household size was 2.59 and the average family size was 2.96.

The median age in the village was 49.1 years. 24% of residents were under the age of 18; 4.2% were between the ages of 18 and 24; 15.8% were from 25 to 44; 34.7% were from 45 to 64; and 21.4% were 65 years of age or older. The gender makeup of the village was 47.9% male and 52.1% female.

2000 census
As of the census of 2000, there were 3,425 people, 1,338 households, and 1,098 families living in the village. The population density was 985.4 people per square mile (380.0/km2). There were 1,382 housing units at an average density of 397.6 per square mile (153.3/km2). The racial makeup of the village was 87.42% White, 8.85% African American, 0.09% Native American, 2.39% Asian, 0.32% from other races, and 0.93% from two or more races. Hispanic or Latino of any race were 0.53% of the population.

There were 1,338 households, out of which 28.1% had children under the age of 18 living with them, 75.6% were married couples living together, 4.7% had a female householder with no husband present, and 17.9% were non-families. 15.8% of all households were made up of individuals, and 9.4% had someone living alone who was 65 years of age or older. The average household size was 2.56 and the average family size was 2.86.

In the village, the population was spread out, with 23.0% under the age of 18, 3.3% from 18 to 24, 18.3% from 25 to 44, 31.0% from 45 to 64, and 24.4% who were 65 years of age or older. The median age was 48 years. For every 100 females there were 96.3 males. For every 100 females age 18 and over, there were 92.4 males.

The median income for a household in the village was $81,492, and the median income for a family was $92,684. Males had a median income of $61,220 versus $37,750 for females. The per capita income for the village was $51,225. About 3.5% of families and 3.5% of the population were below the poverty line, including 3.5% of those under age 18 and 5.1% of those age 65 or over.

Notable people

 Jon Arthur - host of the Saturday morning children's radio series Big Jon and Sparkie.

References

External links
 Village website

Jews and Judaism in Ohio
Populated places established in 1940
Villages in Hamilton County, Ohio
Villages in Ohio
1940 establishments in Ohio